2009–10 Eurocup Basketball was the eighth edition of Europe's second-tier level transnational competition for men's professional basketball clubs, the EuroCup. The EuroCup is the European-wide league level that is one tier below the EuroLeague level. It began with qualifying round matches on October 20, 2009, and ended with the Eurocup Finals on April 17 and 18, 2010, at Fernando Buesa Arena in Vitoria-Gasteiz, Basque Country, Spain. The competition was won by Spanish club Power Electronics Valencia, who won their second EuroCup title, and also secured a place in the 2010–11 edition of the EuroCup's parent competition, the EuroLeague.

For the first time, the EuroCup conducted a four-team final round, as in the EuroLeague. To accommodate this change, a quarterfinal round was introduced. As in the EuroLeague, where the top two teams from each of the four groups in its Top 16 phase advanced to the quarterfinals, the top two teams from each group in the analogous Last 16 phase advanced to the quarterfinals. However, the structure of the EuroCup quarterfinals was very different from that of the EuroLeague — instead of a best-of-5 series, as in the EuroLeague, each EuroCup quarterfinal was a two-legged tie, with the winner determined on aggregate score. Unlike virtually all other basketball competitions, the quarterfinals did not use overtime, unless necessary to break an aggregate tie.

Teams of the 2009–2010 Eurocup

Qualifying round 

|}

Regular season

Top 16

Quarterfinals 

The quarterfinals were two-legged ties determined on aggregate score. The first leg of the Bilbao–Nymburk tie was played on March 23, with all other first legs played on March 24. All return legs were played on March 31. The group winner in each tie, listed as "Team #1", hosted the second leg.

|}

Final four 

The first-ever "final four" in the history of the competition, officially called the Eurocup Finals, was held at Fernando Buesa Arena in Vitoria-Gasteiz, Spain. Euroleague Basketball Company was initially noncommital on whether it would schedule a third-place game, but ultimately decided to do so.

Semifinals 
April 17, Fernando Buesa Arena, Vitoria-Gasteiz

|}

3rd place game 
April 18, Fernando Buesa Arena, Vitoria-Gasteiz

|}

Final 
April 19, Fernando Buesa Arena, Vitoria-Gasteiz

|}

Final standings

Awards

MVP Weekly

Regular season

Top 16

Quarterfinals

Eurocup MVP 
  Marko Banić (Bizkaia Bilbao Basket)

Eurocup Finals MVP 
  Matt Nielsen (Power Electronics Valencia)

All-Eurocup Team

Coach of the Year 
  Ilias Zouros (Panellinios BC)

Rising Star 
  Víctor Claver (Power Electronics Valencia)

Individual statistics

Points

Rebounds

Assists

Notes and references

External links 
 EuroCup Official Website
 European Basketball Website

 
Euro
2009-10